Coelestis from the Latin coelestis meaning celestial may refer to:

 Coelestis, a junior synonym of the moth genus Zygaena
 Coelestis, an alternative spelling of the Roman goddess Caelestis
  Coelestis, a 1993 science fiction novel by Paul Park
 Coelestis Pastor, a 1689 papal encyclical condemning quietism 
 Atlas Coelestis, a 1729 star atlas by John Flamsteed